Eiði  (Northern Faroese [ˈɔiːjɪ];) is a village located on the north-west tip of Eysturoy in the Faroe Islands. It is the seat of Eiði Municipality. It is located 4 km north of Ljósá and 6.5 km west of Funningur.

History
Eiði was first mentioned in writing early in the 14th century, though carbon dating indicated that the village was settled by Vikings, in the 9th century. In the center of the village, is Eiði Church. It was founded on September 18, 1881, and was designed in 1879 by Danish architect Hans Christian Amberg.

The LORAN-C transmitter Ejde was previously located just east of Eiði. The transmitter was deemed obsolete in 2015 and was turned off for the final time on 1 January 2016 and dismantled three years later. It was an important station for submarine navigation during the Cold War. At its peak in the 1960s, the number of employees at the station was 32.

Sports
The village's football team is EB/Streymur. It was founded 1993 as a merger between Eiðis Bóltfelag and Ítróttarfelagið Streymur.

Notable residents
Grækaris Joensen (1835–1897), teacher, politician and the first mayor of the municipality
Hans Pauli Samuelsen (born 1984), football player
Arnbjørn Hansen (born 1986), football player
Doris Olafsdóttir (born 1986), football player

References

External links

Eiði municipality's official website

Populated coastal places in the Faroe Islands
Eiði Municipality